The cane begonias are a group of Begonia cultivars. Their name derives from their tough, bamboo-like stems. They are often ideal as houseplants when kept under control.

Classification

Angel wing
Angel wing begonias are hybrid cane Begonias which resulted from a cross between Begonia aconitifolia and B. coccinea. The hybridization was made by California plant breeder Eva Kenworthy Gray in 1926. The name derives from their pointed leaves.

The flowers are edible, with a sweet tart taste.

Dragon wing
The dragon wing cultivars are sterile, cane forming Begonia × hybrida. They are very similar to Christmas candy begonias and angel wings. To guarantee that Begonia "Dragon Wing" and its companion plants grow in the same place, consider companion plants that have comparable light and water needs. Begonias require partial shade and well-draining soil, and should be watered on a regular basis but allowed to dry out somewhat between waterings.

Superba
The superba begonias are cultivars of Begonia aconitifolia.

References

 .

External links
 Plant Profiles: Angel-wing Begonia a "heavenly" plant, Chicago Botanic Garden
 BEGONIACEAE - BEGONIA FAMILY, Aggie Horticulture
 Guide to propagating Angel wing Begonia

Begonia
House plants